Marcel Lomnický (born 6 July 1987 in Nitra) is a Slovak athlete. He competed for Slovakia in hammer throw at the 2012 Summer Olympics and 2016 Summer Olympics.

Competition record

References

External links 
 
 Marcel Lomnický at the Slovenský Olympijský Výbor 
 

Slovak male hammer throwers
Athletes (track and field) at the 2012 Summer Olympics
Olympic athletes of Slovakia
1987 births
Living people
Sportspeople from Nitra
World Athletics Championships athletes for Slovakia
European Games silver medalists for Slovakia
Athletes (track and field) at the 2015 European Games
European Games medalists in athletics
Athletes (track and field) at the 2016 Summer Olympics
Virginia Tech Hokies men's track and field athletes
Universiade medalists in athletics (track and field)
Universiade silver medalists for Slovakia
Competitors at the 2009 Summer Universiade
Medalists at the 2011 Summer Universiade
Medalists at the 2013 Summer Universiade
Athletes (track and field) at the 2020 Summer Olympics